The Vihti church village (also known as Vihti) is the second largest urban area and former administrative center of the municipality of Vihti (the municipal office moved from the church village to Nummela in 2004) in Uusimaa, Finland. The village is located in the northern part of Vihti on the northern shore of Lake Kirkkojärvi, which belongs to Lake Hiidenvesi. The village has about 3,500 inhabitants.

The church village includes the Vihti Church, the ruins of St. Britget's Church, the Vihti Museum, the Siirilä Art House and the Summer Theater. During the summer, the village hosts the Wuosisatamarkkinat festival and midsummer celebrations, both of which gather thousands of guests. In the summer of 2016, a nationwide mission was held in the village.

In 1994, the church village of Vihti was chosen as the Uusimaa Village of the Year.

See also
 Nurmijärvi (village)
 Vihdintie
 Vihtijärvi

References

Vihti
Villages in Finland